Petr Janečka (born 25 November 1957 in Gottwaldov) is a former Czechoslovak footballer.

He played 39 matches for the Czechoslovakia national team and participated in the 1982 FIFA World Cup. In 1978, he won the Czechoslovak First League with Zbrojovka Brno.

Career
He started in 1967 in TJ Gottwaldov, where he played till 1977. Then he went from 3rd league club to 1st league club Zbrojovka Brno when he was 19. In 1st season in Brno, he won the Czechoslovak First League in 1978.

He missed Euro 1980 in Italy (3rd place) and Moscow Olympic Games 1980 (1st place) due to peptic ulcer disease. He participated in the 1982 FIFA World Cup in Spain, but he did not score, although he played all 3 matches.

Only 5 years after the title, Zbrojovka Brno was relegated in 1983. Janečka, as a national team member, went to Bohemians Prague (which had won its only league title in 1983) to avoid playing in 2nd league.

In 1987, after Bohemians Prague played with Belgian club Beveren in 1987-88 UEFA Cup 1st round, Janečka went to another Belgian club, RC Jet de Bruxelles.

1989, he was back in TJ Gottwaldov in 2nd league.

References

1957 births
Living people
Czech footballers
Czechoslovak footballers
1982 FIFA World Cup players
Czechoslovakia international footballers
Bohemians 1905 players
FC Zbrojovka Brno players
Czechoslovak expatriate footballers
Czechoslovak expatriate sportspeople in Belgium
Association football forwards
Sportspeople from Zlín
Racing Jet Wavre players